Kirk Allen (born 3 May 1971) is a Canadian ski jumper. He competed in the normal hill and large hill events at the 1992 Winter Olympics.

References

External links
 

1971 births
Living people
Canadian male ski jumpers
Olympic ski jumpers of Canada
Ski jumpers at the 1992 Winter Olympics
Skiers from Calgary